Swan Bay is a bounded rural coastal locality of the City of Greater Geelong between Queenscliff and St Leonards, Australia. It is bounded in the west by Portarlington-Queenscliff Road, in the north by Anderson Road, in the east by an offshore line across Swan Bay excluding Swan Island, and in the south by the coastline abutting Queenscliff.

Duck Island is included in the locality, within the Port Phillip Heads Marine National Park (Swan Bay section).

See also
 Swan Bay, the geographic area
 Swan Bay and Port Phillip Bay Islands Important Bird Area

References

Towns in Victoria (Australia)
Coastal towns in Victoria (Australia)
Bellarine Peninsula
Suburbs of Geelong